Moslem Oladghobad (born 29 November 1995) is an Iranian professional futsal player. He is currently a member of Palma in the Primera División de Futsal.

International goals

Honours

International 
 AFC Futsal Championship
 Champion (1): 2018
 Runner-up (1): 2022
 Asian Indoor and Martial Arts Games
 Champion (1): 2017

Club 
 Iranian Futsal Super League
 Champion (1): 2019–20 (Mes Sungun)
 Runners-up (2): 2017–18 (Tasisat Daryaei) - 2018–19 (Giti Pasand)
 Iranian Futsal Hazfi Cup
 Champion (1): 2013–14 (Mahan Tandis)

References

1995 births
Living people
People from Kuhdasht
Futsal forwards
Iranian men's futsal players
Almas Shahr Qom FSC players
Shahrdari Saveh FSC players
Tasisat Daryaei FSC players
Giti Pasand FSC players
Mes Sungun FSC players
Iranian expatriate futsal players
Iranian expatriate sportspeople in Spain
21st-century Iranian people